Rollover cable (also known as a Yost cable, Cisco cable, or a Console cable) is a type of null-modem cable that is used to connect a computer terminal to a router's console port. This cable  is typically flat (and has a light blue color) to help distinguish it from other types of network cabling. It gets the name rollover because the pinouts on one end are reversed from the other, as if the wire had been rolled over and you were viewing it from the other side.

This cabling system was invented to eliminate the differences in RS-232 wiring systems.  Any two RS-232 systems can be directly connected by a standard rollover cable and a standard connector.  For legacy equipment, an adapter is permanently attached to the legacy port.

See also  
 8P8C
 Serial cable
 RS-232

References

Cisco: Cabling Guide for Console and AUX Ports Document ID: 12223
Zonker's Cisco Console Server Connections Guide
Dave Yost Serial Device Wiring Standard

External links

Out-of-band management
Signal cables